The following rabbis were known as the Maharitz:

 Yom Tov Tzahalon
 Yosef Tzvi Dushinsky (first Dushinsky rebbe)
 Yihhyah Salahh, an 18th-century Yemenite rabbi, writer of the current Baladi rite prayer book